Hegewald may refer to:

Hegewald (colony), a short-lived German colony in Reichskommissariat Ukraine
Hegewald Film, a German film production company
Liddy Hegewald (1884–1950), German film producer
Tobias Hegewald (born 1989), German car racer

See also
 Hegenwald

German-language surnames